Lord Ruthven may refer to:

People

Lord Ruthven
 Lord Ruthven, a title in the peerage of Scotland from 1488, used until 1581 on the creation of Earl of Gowrie
William Ruthven, 1st Lord Ruthven (d. 1528)
William Ruthven, 2nd Lord Ruthven (d. 1552)
Patrick Ruthven, 3rd Lord Ruthven (c. 1520–1566)
William Ruthven, 1st Earl of Gowrie, 4th Lord Ruthven, (d. 1584), created Earl of Gowrie in 1581

Lord Ruthven of Freeland and Baron Ruthven of Gowrie
 Lord Ruthven of Freeland, a title in the peerage of Scotland since 1651
 Thomas Ruthven, 1st Lord Ruthven of Freeland (died 1671), Scottish nobleman
 David Ruthven, 2nd Lord Ruthven of Freeland (died 1701), Lord High Treasurer of Scotland
James Ruthven, 7th Lord Ruthven of Freeland (1777–1853)
Walter Hore-Ruthven, 9th Lord Ruthven of Freeland (1838–1921), created Baron Ruthven of Gowrie in 1919
 Walter Hore-Ruthven, 10th Lord Ruthven of Freeland, 2nd Baron Ruthven of Gowrie (1870–1956), British Major-General
 Charles Howard, 12th Earl of Carlisle, 12th Lord Ruthven of Freeland (1923–1994)
 George Howard, 13th Earl of Carlisle, 13th Lord Ruthven of Freeland (born 1949)

Lord Ruthven of Ettrick
 Patrick Ruthven, 1st Earl of Forth (c. 1573–1651)

Viscount Ruthven of Canberra
Alexander Hore-Ruthven, 1st Earl of Gowrie, also created Viscount Ruthven of Canberra in 1944
Viscount Ruthven of Canberra, now a courtesy title of the heir apparent of the Earl of Gowrie
Grey Ruthven, 2nd Earl of Gowrie (born 1939), known as Lord Ruthven until 1955
Brer Ruthven, Viscount Ruthven of Canberra (b. 1964), his son

Fictional characters
 Lord Ruthven (vampire), a fictional character
 Lord de Ruthven, a fictional character in the 1816 Gothic novel Glenarvon, by Lady Caroline Lamb

Ruthven
Ruthven
Ruthven